
Gmina Długołęka is a rural gmina (administrative district) in Wrocław County, Lower Silesian Voivodeship, in south-western Poland. It is part of the Wrocław metropolitan area.

Neighbouring gminas
Gmina Długołęka is bordered by the city of Wrocław and by the gminas of Czernica, Dobroszyce, Oleśnica, Trzebnica, Wisznia Mała and Zawonia.

Villages
The gmina contains the villages of Bąków, Bielawa, Bierzyce, Borowa, Brzezia Łąka, Budziwojowice, Bukowina, Byków, Dąbrowica, Długołęka, Dobroszów Oleśnicki, Domaszczyn, Godzieszowa, Jaksonowice, Januszkowice, Kamień, Kątna, Kępa, Kiełczów, Kiełczówek, Krakowiany, Łosice, Łozina, Michałowice, Mirków, Oleśniczka, Pasikurowice, Piecowice, Pietrzykowice, Pruszowice, Raków, Ramiszów, Siedlec, Skała, Śliwice, Stępin, Szczodre, Tokary, Węgrów, Wilczyce and Zaprężyn.

Twin towns – sister cities

Gmina Długołęka is twinned with:
 Fossano, Italy
 Sarny, Ukraine
 Velen, Germany

References

Dlugoleka
Wrocław County